R. Lee James (born November 20, 1948) is a Republican member of the Pennsylvania House of Representatives. He has represented the 64th District since 2013.

James graduated from Oil City High School. He then served for six years as an active duty member of the United States Navy. After his discharge, he enrolled in Clarion University, earning a bachelor's degree. He worked in commercial banking for a decade before returning to Clarion to receive a master's in business administration. James later worked as an investment manager.

Career 
James currently sits on the Appropriations, Environmental Resources & Energy, Local Government, Tourism & Recreational Development committees.

References

External links

Living people
Republican Party members of the Pennsylvania House of Representatives
People from Venango County, Pennsylvania
Clarion University of Pennsylvania alumni
1948 births
21st-century American politicians